Sand Coulee is a census-designated place and unincorporated community in Cascade County, Montana, United States. Its population was 212 as of the 2010 census. Sand Coulee has a post office with ZIP code 59472.

Named Giffen in 1881, after Nat McGiffen, the town’s name changed to Sand Coulee when the McGiffens left the area. In 1883 Sand Coulee Coal Company, a coal mining company, was established. Recognizing the potential, James J. Hill purchased the company and renamed it Cottonwood Coal Company. The town slowly withered when the railroad switched to diesel engines in the 1930s.

Demographics

Education
Centerville Public Schools educates students from kindergarten through 12th grade. They serve the communities of Sand Coulee, Centerville, Tracy and Stockett. Centerville High School is a Class C school. They are known as the Miners.

References

Census-designated places in Cascade County, Montana
Census-designated places in Montana
Unincorporated communities in Montana
Unincorporated communities in Cascade County, Montana